Staeffler Ridge is a long ridge west of Hanson Ridge, separating Victoria Lower Glacier from Greenwood Valley in Victoria Land. Named by the Advisory Committee on Antarctic Names (US-ACAN) in 1964 for George R. Staeffler, topographic engineer with the U.S. Geological Survey, who worked in the McMurdo Sound area during 1960–61.

Further reading
 P.J. FORSYTH, N. MORTIMER & I.M. TURNBULL, Plutonic Rocks from the Cape Roberts Hinterland: Wilson Piedmont Glacier, Southern Victoria Land, Antarctica , Institute of Geological & Nuclear Sciences, Private Bag 1930, Dunedin - New Zealand

Ridges of Victoria Land
McMurdo Dry Valleys